Goldsberry Township is an inactive township in Howell County, in the U.S. state of Missouri.

Goldsberry Township has the name of William H. Goldsberry, an early settler.

References

Townships in Missouri
Townships in Howell County, Missouri